Old Town Hall and School, also known as the Haymarket Museum, is a historic town hall and school located at Haymarket, Prince William County, Virginia. It was built in 1883, and is a front-gable, two-story, wooden structure clad in weatherboard with Greek Revival and Victorian style decorative elements.  It features a square, pyramidal-roofed belfry situated above the front gable that has louvers, sawn brackets, and gables on each face.  Its use as a school stopped around 1900. It continued to serve as the Town Hall as well as a community meeting place until 2001.  The building currently houses the Haymarket Museum.  

It was added to the National Register of Historic Places in 2011.

References

External links
Haymarket Museum website

City and town halls on the National Register of Historic Places in Virginia
School buildings on the National Register of Historic Places in Virginia
Government buildings completed in 1827
Greek Revival architecture in Virginia
Victorian architecture in Virginia
Buildings and structures in Prince William County, Virginia
National Register of Historic Places in Prince William County, Virginia
Museums in Prince William County, Virginia
History museums in Virginia
1827 establishments in Virginia